This is the complete list of works by American military science fiction writer John Ringo.

Bibliography

Series

Black Tide Rising
Series based on a zombie apocalypse, but dealing with living, near-rabid, infected humans rather than the living dead. The story centers around a family of survivalists (mother, father, and two teenage daughters) who get early warning of the plague; they escape by boat, only to realize that they are the best hope for others stranded at sea.
 Under a Graveyard Sky (September 2013)
 To Sail a Darkling Sea (February 2014)
 Islands of Rage and Hope (August 2014)
 Strands of Sorrow (January 2015)
 Black Tide Rising (June 2016), anthology co-edited with Gary Poole
 The Valley of Shadows (November 2018), co-written with Mike Massa
 Voices Of The Fall (March 2019), anthology co-edited with Gary Poole
 River of Night (July 2019), co-written with Mike Massa
 We Shall Rise (June 2021), anthology co-edited with Gary Poole 978-1982125585
 
Additionally and for completeness, the following books are included in the series but are not written by John Ringo:
 At the End of the World (July 2020), by Charles E. Gannon
 At the End of the Journey (May 2021), by Charles E. Gannon

Troy Rising
The Troy Rising series was inspired by Howard Tayler's webcomic Schlock Mercenary and its universe. It was created with Tayler's approval, but is not considered canon for the webcomic series.
The series is set in the early days of human-alien contact, with humans forced to defend the Earth from the alien invasion.
Live Free or Die (February 2010) sample chapters
Citadel (January 2011) sample chapters
The Hot Gate (May 2011) sample chapters

Legacy of the Aldenata

Also known as the "Posleen Series" and "Posleen War Series" after the name of the invading species besetting and successfully conquering much of Earth.

Posleen War—Central storyline
A Hymn Before Battle (2000) 
Gust Front (2001) 
When the Devil Dances (2002) 
Hell's Faire (2003)

Hedren War
Eye of the Storm (2009);

Posleen War sidestories
Watch on the Rhine (2005) (with Tom Kratman) 
Yellow Eyes (2007) (with Tom Kratman)
The Tuloriad (2009) (with Tom Kratman)sample chapters

Cally's War spinoff series
Co-written with Julie Cochrane, this series is more cloak-and-dagger spy-genre fiction, with humans striving to overcome the game rigged by the Darhel race, which has the rest of the galaxy's races in virtual thralldom—except for the Posleen and humans, whom they fear. The Darhel systematically use humans to combat the Posleen, while bleeding the humans whenever and wherever possible by underhanded clandestine acts to weaken the future options of humanity.

 Cally's War (2004) (with Julie Cochrane)
 Sister Time (2007) (with Julie Cochrane) 
 Honor of the Clan (2009) (with Julie Cochrane)

Spinoff books
This sequel is set about a millennium after the other main Posleen Series works.
The Hero (2004) (with Michael Z. Williamson)

Empire of Man

Also known as the "Prince Roger Series"

Co-written with David Weber, with multiple books still under contract

 March Upcountry (May 2001) 
 March to the Sea (Aug 2001)
 March to the Stars (2003)
 We Few (2005)
 Omnibus collections
 Empire of Man (February 2014) ; collects March Upcountry and March to the Sea
 Throne of Stars (August 2014); collects March to the Stars and We Few

The Council Wars

There Will Be Dragons (2003)
Emerald Sea (2004) 
Against the Tide (2005) 
East of the Sun, West of the Moon (2006)

Paladin of Shadows
This is a series of contemporary-era techno-thrillers, much like Tom Clancy's works but with less politics and a closer-to-the-ground level and action focus.

Ringo has stated that these novels stemmed from a nagging idea between contracted books. He believed that the concept was too over-the-top and offensive to be of much interest to his usual audience, and so wrote the first book with no intention of publishing it, as a way to get the idea out of his head. However, during interactions with fans, he mentioned the unpublished story and was surprised that the premise was met with enthusiasm. The Paladin of Shadows series contain graphic scenes of rape, bondage, torture, and underage sex, as Ringo's protagonist's anti-terrorism missions butt heads with harsh economic realities of commercial sexual slavery in Eastern Europe and its connection to funding arms for terrorist organizations. 
 
 Ghost (2005)
 Kildar (March 2006) 
 Choosers of the Slain (July 2006) 
 Unto the Breach (Dec 2006) 
 A Deeper Blue (2007)
 Tiger by the Tail (2013) (With Ryan Sear)

The central hero, Michael Harmon (A.K.A. Mike Jenkins, A.K.A. Ghost), is a self-proclaimed sadist, repressed rapist, former United States Navy Boatswain's Mate 1st Class, and a trainer of US Navy SEALs. While walking after a class on the campus of the University of Georgia, he witnesses a woman being kidnapped. He impulsively follows the kidnapper and rescues several abducted women and earns the gratitude of several nations, a small fortune, and a series of high-level political connections in the process of experiencing a life change. The work is, in fact, three connected anti-terrorism novellas spanning about a year, backstory omitted from the last two, where "Jenkins" takes on a certain James Bond–style sole operator/loose cannon role. The work features scenes involving the interception of two nuclear devices, saving Paris and Washington, D.C., while featuring a travelogue through part of the seamier sides of the Balkans and European parts of the former Soviet Union.
 
In the second work, Harmon buys an estate in the eastern Europe country of Georgia that has an entailed ancient warrior tribe, called the Keldera, who bestow on him the honorific "The Kildar" (Warlord, Baron, or similar title). The Keldera aid him in reducing tensions in the Caucasus. Again the book shows a life transition, this time from a sole shooter to a, politically connected local warlord. In subsequent books, the tribe, now being trained up into a superb light company, goes operational and is employed as a deniable black-ops force by the United States for the next several works. By A Deeper Blue, some of the Keldaran force has been trained in both SCUBA and HALO jumps, while Tiger by the Tail shows the force on an extended training mission in the Pacific, gradually being transformed en toto into a force equivalent to U.S. Navy SEAL Teams—but in company strength.

Other major/recurring characters in the Paladin of Shadows series include Charles Adams, a retired SEAL Master Chief, intel specialist and former USMC Sergeant Patrick Vanner, United States Army War College graduate Colonel David Nielson, a retired Special Ops Civil Affairs Specialist who serves as Mike's de facto Chief of Staff and the only American officer on his senior staff, Captains Kasey Bathlick and Tamara Wilson (call signs Dragon and Valkryie), two Marine Corps helicopter pilots, Captain John Hardesty, a charter pilot for Chatham Aviation in England/former Royal Air Force major/squadron leader who frequently flies Mike around the globe, Colonel Bob Pierson, the Office of Strategic Operations Liaison at the Pentagon who serves as one of Mike's primary contacts within the United States government, 2nd Lieutenant Britney "Bambi" Harder, who was rescued by Mike in Ghost and by A Deeper Blue is a junior intelligence officer at United States Special Operations Command Headquarters, MacDill Air Force Base, Florida, Anastasia Rakovitch, a masochistic 26-year-old Russian-born woman given to the Kildar by an Uzbek sheikh who now serves as his harem manager, Daria Koroleva, the Kildar's personal assistant, Katya "Cottontail" Ivanova, the sociopathic man-hating whore-turned-spy and assassin, and David and Amanda Cliff, the President and First Lady of the United States.

Voyage of the Space Bubble

Also called the Looking Glass series

All books titles in the series are phrases taken from the poem "Jabberwocky", which is mentioned repeatedly in the later novels.

Into the Looking Glass (2005) 
Vorpal Blade (2007) (with Travis S. Taylor)
Manxome Foe (2008) (with Travis S. Taylor) 
Claws that Catch (2008) (with Travis S. Taylor)

Special Circumstances
These novels describe the Foundation for Love and Universal Faith (FLUF), an organization whose members include Druids, Wiccans, Asartru, Buddhists, and
other non-traditional religions.  They assist the FBI and other law enforcement agencies worldwide in investigating events and crimes involving the supernatural, which is termed 'Special Circumstances' by the FBI. 

Princess of Wands (2006)
Queen of Wands (2012)

Monster Hunter Memoirs
Co-written with Larry Correia

A prequel series set in the Monster Hunter International universe during the 1980s.

Monster Hunter Memoirs: Grunge (August 2, 2016)
Monster Hunter Memoirs: Sinners (December 6, 2016)
Monster Hunter Memoirs: Saints (July 3, 2018)

Last Judgment’s Fire
Co-written with Kacey Ezell and Christopher L. Smith

A post apocalyptic series centered on a young farmer in search of his destiny while trying to prevent a cataclysmic war. Set thirty years after giant electrovoric ants and pterodons came through a rift in space-time, killing millions of people and disrupting nearly all electrical power systems and generation worldwide. 

Gunpowder & Embers (January 7, 2020)

Non-series novels
 The Road to Damascus (2004; a Bolo book with Linda Evans) 
 Von Neumann's War (2006; with Travis S. Taylor)
 The Last Centurion (2008)
 Into the Real (2022; with author Lydia Sherrer)

Short stories
 "Let's Go to Prague" (2003)
 included in The Service of the Sword edited by David Weber, and are set in Weber's Honorverse.
 "A Ship Named Francis" (2003)
 included in The Service of the Sword edited by David Weber, and are set in Weber's Honorverse.
 Other contributions to Jim Baen's Universe—launched in 2005, a members-only science fiction and fantasy e-zine edited by Eric Flint.

References

Bibliographies by writer
Bibliographies of American writers
Science fiction bibliographies
Nanotechnology in fiction
Black Tide Rising
Military science fiction